Savannah Stehlin (born March 6, 1996) is an American actress. Savannah's most known  role is Spork, the leading role in the musical comedy film  Spork. She has also appeared in four episodes of the TV series Sleeper Cell and, in 2016, had the role of Elsie Holloway in the horror thriller film Viscilla.

Biography

Early life
Stehlin was born in Jacksonville, Florida. She began her acting career at age 2 in the nationally televised Fort Lauderdale Christmas Pageant. By the age of 4, she had landed the part of a soloist in the pageant. Stehlin performed in 15 shows, each with a live audience of 3,000 people. Later, she began auditioning for commercials throughout Florida and, shortly after, was booked on a non-union Burdines commercial. By the age of 6, Stehlin had booked several national commercials. While working on a Publix commercial, she came in contact with her current manager, Sharon Lane. She moved to L.A. soon after.

Music
Savannah Stehlin, at the age of 13, started  writing  and performing songs including:  "I'm Carrying My Heart," "I'm in Love," and "Why, Oh Why."

Filmography

References

External links

1996 births
21st-century American actresses
Actresses from Jacksonville, Florida
American film actresses
American television actresses
Living people
Musicians from Jacksonville, Florida